Serra dos Três Irmãos Ecological Station is an ecological station in the state of Rondônia, Brazil.
It is a strictly protected conservation unit that preserves an area of Amazon rainforest with exceptional biodiversity.

History

Some land was taken from the Rio Vermelho State Forest.
An act of 30 June 2004 gave preliminary approval for implementation of the ecological station.

Location

The Serra dos Três Irmãos Ecological Station is in the municipality of Porto Velho, Rondônia.
It is in the north west of the state on the left bank of the Madeira River.
It is largely surrounded by the Mapinguari National Park.
It is in the Amazon biome.
The ESEC contains 19% dense rainforest, 44% open rainforest and 37% savannah-rainforest contact.
There are two support bases on the banks of the Karipunas and São Lourenço streams.
About 240 species of tree have been identified in two small surveys.

Conservation

The ecological station is managed by the State Department of Environmental Development.
The terms of reference for the management plan was published on 31 December 2014, although the plan had not been formally approved.
As an ecological station the unit has the purpose of preserving nature and supporting scientific research.
It is publicly owned.
Public visits are allowed for educational purposes and for scientific research, subject to approval by the responsible agency.
The conservation unit is supported by the Amazon Region Protected Areas Program.

Fauna

The Madeira River, a major tributary of the Amazon River, plays a basic role in zoogeography of mammals, particularly primates and rodents.
Several species that occur north of the river (left bank) do not occur to the south.
These include the night monkey (Aotus cf. nigriceps), white-fronted capuchin (Cebus albifrons), Hershkovitz's titi (Callicebus dubius), white-lipped tamarin (Saguinus labiatus),  black-capped squirrel monkey (Saimiri boliviensis) and the rodent green acouchi (Myoprocta pratti).
A total of 24 species of mammals were recorded during a rapid ecological assessment, including 9 primates.
The brown woolly monkey (Lagothrix lagotricha) is found in large numbers.
During environmental assessment studies for the upper Madeira River hydroelectric projects 27 species were seen, including 9 primates, five forms of squirrel, two of common agouti (Dasyprocta), two deer,  ocelot (Leopardus pardalis), a mustelidae and three rodents.
Four of the species were unidentified, indicating exceptional biodiversity and the need for further research.

Notes

Sources

Ecological stations of Brazil
Protected areas of Rondônia
Protected areas established in 1990
1990 establishments in Brazil